The Last Alaskans is an American reality television series. The series premiered on Animal Planet on May 25, 2015. The second season premiered on the Discovery Channel on April 12, 2016. The fourth and final season premiered on the Discovery Channel on November 25, 2018.
The series follows several families and trappers who live in the Arctic National Wildlife Refuge in Alaska.

Series overview

Episodes

Season 1 (2015)

Season 2 (2016)

Season 3 (2017)

Season 4 (2018)

References

External links
 

2010s American reality television series
2015 American television series debuts
Discovery Channel original programming
Animal Planet original programming
2019 American television series endings